The 16305 / 06 Intercity Express is an Express train belonging to Indian Railways Southern Railway zone that runs between  and  in India.

Coaches
The 16305 / 06 Intercity Express has one AC Chair car, two Chair car, 14 general unreserved & two SLR (seating with luggage rake) coaches . It does not carry a pantry car coach.

As is customary with most train services in India, coach composition may be amended at the discretion of Indian Railways depending on demand.

Service

Routing

Stops
Thalassery, Mahe, Vadakara, Kozhikode, Parappanangadi, Tanur, Tirur, Kuttippuram, Shornur Junction, Thrissur, Irinjalakuda, Chalakkudy, Angamali, Aluva, Ernakulam Town (only for 16306)

Traction
A Diesel loco Shed, Ernakulam based WDM-3A diesel  locomotive used to pull the train for both directions. As the route is completely electrified now, Erode based WAP-4 pulls the train now.

References

External links
16305 Intercity Express at India Rail Info
16306 Intercity Express at India Rail Info

Intercity Express (Indian Railways) trains
Transport in Kannur
Rail transport in Kerala
Transport in Kochi